The 1982 African Cup of Nations Final was a football match that took place on March 19, 1982, at the Stade de 11-Juin in Tripoli, Libya, to determine the winner of the 1982 African Cup of Nations. Ghana defeated Libya 7–6 on penalty kicks after regulation ended 1–1 with goals from George Alhassan for Ghana and from Ali Al-Beshari for Libya. This was Ghana's fourth and last continental title as of 2019.

Road to the final

Match

Details

References

External links
- 11v11
Qualifications details - rsssf

Final
1982
1982
1982
1981–82 in Ghanaian football
1981–82 in Libyan football
20th century in Tripoli, Libya
Africa Cup of Nations Final 1982
March 1982 sports events in Africa